Muhammad Nazrul bin Ahmad Nazari (born 11 February 1991) is a Singaporean professional footballer who plays as a full-back or winger for Singapore Premier League club Hougang United and the Singapore national team.

Club career

Young Lions
Nazrul began his professional football career with Under-23 side Young Lions in the S.League in 2009.

LionsXII
In December 2011, the FAS announced that Nazrul was to join the newly formed LionsXII for the 2012 Malaysia Super League.

Hougang United
In 2016, Nazrul signed for Hougang United for the 2016 S.League campaign after LionsXII was disbanded in 2015.

International career
Nazrul made his international debut for Singapore in a friendly match against Hong Kong on 15 August 2012.

In 2022, Nazrul was included in the team for the 2022 FAS Tri-Nations Series and 2022 AFF Championship.

Career statistics

Club

. Caps and goals may not be correct.

 Young Lions and LionsXII are ineligible for qualification to AFC competitions in their respective leagues.
 Young Lions withdrew from the 2011 and 2012 Singapore Cup, and the 2011 Singapore League Cup due to participation in AFC and AFF youth competitions.

International

International caps

International goals
Scores and results list Singapore's goal tally first.

Honours

Club
LionsXII
Malaysia Super League: 2013

References

1991 births
Living people
Singaporean footballers
Singapore international footballers
LionsXII players
Singapore Premier League players
Association football wingers
Singaporean people of Malay descent
Malaysia Super League players
Young Lions FC players
Footballers at the 2010 Asian Games
Footballers at the 2014 Asian Games
Southeast Asian Games bronze medalists for Singapore
Southeast Asian Games medalists in football
Competitors at the 2013 Southeast Asian Games
Asian Games competitors for Singapore